Aspden is the historic name of a valley a mile west of Church and a mile north of Oswaldtwistle, between Accrington and Blackburn, in Lancashire, England.  The modern name of this location is Aspen.

By 1990, there were three houses there:  Aspen Cottage, a large ruinous farm, and a large house, apparently Elizabethan, which has in its grounds a small plain house, said to be older.  The valley is bounded on three sides by a loop of the Leeds and Liverpool Canal, and on the fourth by a high railway embankment (Aspen Viaduct).  On the other side of the canal, overlooking the valley, is the Accrington and District Golf Club.

The road into the valley is now called Lower Aspen Lane upon which is located Lower Aspen Farm. The postcode is BB5 4NY. A map of the location may be found here.

Aspen Colliery (disused by 1930) is now a scheduled ancient monument.

The national and international significance of Aspden is that it is the source of the surname Aspden which is common in east Lancashire and has now spread elsewhere in England and the English speaking world. Adam de Aspden is seen witnessing charters through a period beginning in 1262.

References 
 Articles by Arthur Howarth in the quarterly magazine of the Lancashire Family History and Heraldry Society
 August 1990 "A Lancashire Family: Aspden of Aspden, Burnley and Cliviger" (pp 25–31) 
 November 1989 "Aspden/Astin of Habergham Eaves and Worsthorne" (pp 34–36)

Geography of Hyndburn